Brett Thompson may refer to:

 Brett Thompson (cricketer) (born 1987), South African cricketer
 Brett Thompson (racing driver) (born 1977), American racing driver
 Brett Thompson (rugby union) (born 1990), American rugby union player